Miss Jealousy is a pop album by Swedish singer Charlotte Nilsson, released in 2001.

Track listing
You Got Me Going Crazy
Miss Jealousy
Game Over, You Win
I'm the One for You
Light of My Life
One Kiss Away
Ain't No Mountain
I Can Tell
Baby It's You
Crying in the Rain
Don't Wanna Let Go
Don't Give Me up

Charts

References

2001 albums
Charlotte Perrelli albums